The 2010–11 season for St Johnstone is the club's second back in the Scottish Premier League. They will compete in the Scottish Premier League, Scottish Cup and the Scottish League Cup during the campaign.

Results and fixtures

Scottish Premier League

Scottish League Cup

Scottish Cup

League table

Squad

External links
St Johnstone's fixtures at the club's official website
BBC Sport's St Johnstone page

St Johnstone F.C. seasons
St Johnstone